The Continental Mark series (later Lincoln Mark series) is a series of personal luxury cars that was produced by Ford Motor Company.  The nomenclature came into use with the Continental Mark II for 1956, which was a successor to the Lincoln Continental of 1939–1948.  Following the discontinuation of the Mark II, Ford continued the use of the Mark series on Continental branded vehicles from 1958 to 1960.  Following a hiatus, Lincoln-Mercury relaunched the Continental Mark series during 1968 and would produce six successive generations through the 1998 model year.

Serving as the flagship vehicle of Ford Motor Company for its entire production, the Mark series continued the use of Continental branding positioned above Lincoln after the Continental Division was discontinued in July 1956 (distinct from the 1961 and onward Lincoln Continental); it was marketed and serviced by Lincoln-Mercury.  To eliminate the branding confusion, the Mark series dropped Continental branding and adopted the Lincoln name from the 1986 model year onward.  In line with both the 1940s Lincoln Continental and the Continental Mark II, most versions of the Mark series were produced as two-door coupes (personal cars); at various times through its production, various body styles have also been offered for the model line.  With the exception of the nearly hand-built Continental Mark II, the model line has shared chassis underpinnings with other Ford or Lincoln-Mercury vehicles, with model-specific interior and exterior body panels.

Derived from the original Lincoln Continental, the continental tire trunklid design feature was adopted by each generation (in various forms) from the Continental Mark II to the final Lincoln Mark VIII.  The Lincoln four-point star emblem is a design feature that was introduced by the Continental Mark II.

After the 1998 model year, Lincoln ended the Mark series with the Mark VIII, as the division shifted away from personal luxury cars to concentrate on four-door sedans and SUVs.  From 2007 to 2020, Lincoln introduced a visually-similar "MK" prefix for its sedans; the nomenclature was phased out in favor of conventional names (or model lines dropped altogether).

From 1958 to 1998, Mark series vehicles were produced alongside Lincolns by Wixom Assembly at Wixom, Michigan.

Background 
Prior to the Continental/Lincoln Mark series, within Ford Motor Company, the Continental nameplate began life in 1939, following the design of a custom-built Lincoln-Zephyr convertible commissioned by Edsel Ford.  Modified extensively over a production vehicle, the personal car had a lowered hoodline, a relocated passenger compartment (requiring an external-mount spare tire), and deletion of the running boards.  Upon taking delivery of the car in Florida, Ford discovered the vehicle generated a high degree of interest from potential buyers; renamed Continental by Ford, the name reflected European styling influences for its design.

At the end of the 1930s, Lincoln was transitioning away from the exclusive Lincoln K-series and moving towards the more contemporary and affordable Lincoln-Zephyr coupes and sedans.  As a flagship, Edsel Ford wanted to revive the popularity of the 1929–1932 Lincoln Victoria coupe and convertible with an updated approach, reflecting European styling influences.

Continental Division 
For 1949, the Lincoln Continental was discontinued, as Ford sought to introduce post-war model lines for all three of its divisions.  In 1952, the company commenced design work on a successor model line; following the 1953 introduction of the limited-production Cadillac Eldorado, Buick Skylark, and Oldsmobile Fiesta, Ford also sought to create a competitor, aiming to make a model line as exclusive as the 1930s K-series.

As its new model line was to be one of the most exclusive and expensive automobiles in the world, Ford chose to create a stand-alone division positioned above Lincoln in 1955, the same year Chrysler introduced the Imperial Division.  The namesake of the 1940s Lincoln Continental, the Continental Division named its model line the Mark II.  Along with aligning it as a successor to the pre-war Lincoln Continental, the Mark II designation was a convention used by European industry; along with automobiles (i.e., Jaguar Mark 1), similar nomenclature was used to identify versions of artillery, tanks, naval vessels, and aircraft.

In July 1956, Ford integrated Continental into Lincoln-Mercury, which marketed Continental as a marque positioned above Lincoln; the Mark II was withdrawn after the 1957 model year.  From 1958 to 1960, Continental remained in a similar role, replacing the Mark II with the Mark III, Mark IV, and Mark V as flagship vehicles above the Lincoln sedan line.

For 1961, Lincoln-Mercury consolidated the Lincoln model line with a singular Lincoln Continental replacing both the Continental Mark V and both Lincoln lines; the division would serve this single line of Lincoln sedans through the 1976 model year.

Continental Mark revival 
In response to the introduction of the two-door Rolls-Royce Silver Shadow (later renamed the Corniche) in the United States, Ford vice-president Lee Iacocca directed Ford vice president of design Gene Bordinat to "put a Rolls-Royce grille on a Thunderbird" in September 1965. Not branded a Lincoln, the all-new model line was effectively a reboot of the Continental Mark series, adopting the Continental Mark III nomenclature as a direct successor to Continental Mark II (leaving the 1958–1960 Mark series aside).  In line with the design directive, the Mark III adopted a large radiator-style grille and was a large two-door coupe (using the frame of the four-door Thunderbird). While no longer intended as a functional feature, the Continental spare-tire trunklid made its return as a styling feature to further distinguish the model line.

While less expensive than its Rolls-Royce design inspiration, the Mark III competed against premium luxury coupes from American manufacturers, including the Imperial Crown Coupe and the Cadillac Eldorado; the latter two model lines formed a model rivalry lasting through multiple model generations.

Following the Mark III, Ford developed five successive generations of the model line.  During the 1970s, the Mark IV and the Mark V shared a chassis with the Ford Thunderbird through 1976; the Mark V was a substantial revision of the Mark IV.  The 1980 Mark VI was the first model to undergo downsizing, adopting the full-size Ford Panther platform; a four-door sedan was offered for the first time since 1958–1960.  The Mark VII was downsized further for 1984,  sharing the Ford Fox platform with the Ford Thunderbird, Mercury Cougar and Lincoln Continental sedan; the model was offered only as a coupe.  The Lincoln Mark VIII grew slightly in size for 1993, derived again from the Ford Thunderbird and Mercury Cougar.

First generation (Mark II; 1956–1957) 

From the 1956 model year, Ford Motor Company and its Lincoln division introduced the Continental Mark II as the inaugural offering of their new flagship Continental Division.  A two-door personal luxury car, the Mark II was developed as the successor model line for the 1939–1948 Lincoln Continental.  Largely hand-assembled, the $10,000 (US$ in  dollars) model line was the most expensive American vehicle sold in 1956, competing against Chrysler's new for 1955 Imperial top marque – matching even Rolls-Royce in price (or two new Cadillacs). Air conditioning was the only optional extra.

The Mark II returned the long-hood, short-deck exterior design of its predecessor, reviving its rear spare tire design feature as part of the trunklid (the design was partly functional, as the trunklid closed around the vertically-mounted spare tire).  In contrast to many American (and some European) vehicles, the exterior was highly conservative, limiting chrome trim to the grille, window trim, bumpers, and badging.

During 1956, Continental was integrated into Lincoln, leaving the Mark II coupe as the only model line of the Continental Division.  In spite of its status as the most expensive vehicle sold in the United States, the high cost of its assembly led Ford to lose over $1000 for each Mark II produced, leading to its discontinuation after the 1957 model year.  In response to the Mark II, Cadillac released the Cadillac Eldorado Brougham; while far different in design, the Eldorado Brougham was the first Cadillac to rival the model line directly, leading to a rivalry that would last through the 1998 Lincoln Mark VIII.

Successor (Mark III, Mark IV, Mark V; 1958–1960) 

Following the integration of Continental within Lincoln-Mercury in July 1956, Ford sought for ways to bring its flagship brand to profitability.  After the 1957 model year, the hand-assembled Mark II was discontinued and replaced for 1958 with the Mark III branded as a Continental which was positioned above the Lincoln brand with higher trim sharing all new bodies that were built at the new Wixom Assembly Plant. 

As part of an ultimatum to continue the brand, Continental underwent a US$4,000 (40%) price reduction ($ in  dollars ), giving the all-new Continental Mark III a market position against the highest-trim Cadillacs and Imperials.  To facilitate the price reduction, the Mark III was assembled in the same factory as the Ford Thunderbird, Lincoln Capri and Lincoln Premiere.  Distinguished by its reverse-slant, retractable "Breezeway" rear window on all models – including convertibles, the Mark III was both one of the first Ford Motor Company vehicles to feature unitary body construction (along with the contemporaneous 1958–1960 Thunderbirds), but also one of Ford's largest unibody vehicles in history. In other firsts, FM radio joined AM radio as an option; "Auto Lube" automatically lubricated the entire car (through an oil reservoir kept full by the owner). The 1958–1960 Mark III–V has the distinction of being the only Continental Mark series vehicles offered as a convertible. The listed retail price of the convertible was US$6,283 ($ in  dollars ) and 3,048 were built.

The 1959 Mark IV introduced two formal sedans, the Continental Town Car and Limousine.  The Town Car/Limousine replaced the reverse-slant window with a forward-sloping rear window (moving the rear seat several inches rearward); the Limousine has a rear-seat partition.  Other options include dual air conditioning units and a padded vinyl top; both versions were offered only in black.  214 Town Cars were sold and 83 Limousines were sold, making them the rarest Mark series variants.

The 1960 Mark V was restyled slightly, receiving a larger grille and new "dagmar bumpers".

Superlatives 

In terms of standard production sedans without an extended wheelbase, the 1958–1960 Continentals and Lincolns are some of the largest automobiles ever made.  The Continental Mark III, IV and V are the longest cars produced by the Ford Motor Company without federally mandated 5-mph bumpers.  The 1959 Mark IV and 1960 Mark V Limousines and Town Cars are the heaviest American standard-wheelbase sedans built since World War II. 1960 is the only model year that a Mark series vehicle is mentioned as a Lincoln Continental in brochures and advertising.

While designers of the model line are related to a number of contemporary significant styling achievements, the launch of the 1969 Continental Mark III (and its relaunch of the Mark series nomenclature) has led to the term "forgotten Marks" in relation to the 1958–1960 generation.

Second generation (Mark III; 1969–1971)

Introduced in April 1968 for 1969, the Continental Mark III was developed for Ford to re-enter the personal luxury segment, competing against the Cadillac Eldorado for the first time since the discontinuation of the Mark II.  The Mark III name was a revival of the Mark series nomenclature; along with making the new model line a true successor to the Mark II exclusively as a luxury coupe, it also effectively skipped the 1958–1960 Lincoln-based Continental Mark III, IV and V.  As before, the Mark III was branded a Continental, but was sold and serviced by Lincoln-Mercury dealer networks.

Sharing its chassis with the Thunderbird four-door, the Mark III was a two-door coupe.  Sharing design elements similar to the Lincoln Continental, the Mark III was distinguished by its lack of vent windows, its radiator-style grille, hidden headlights, and spare-tire trunklid (which no longer covered a spare tire).  Several of these elements would find their way into the Continental as part of its 1970 redesign.  Debuting in the Mark III, the 460 cubic-inch V8 would see use in multiple full-size, intermediate, and light-truck model lines.

For 1970, multiple functional changes were made.  For the first time, a vinyl roof was standard equipment and the windshield wipers were now fully concealed.  Several upgrades were made related to safety, including a locking steering column (with a rim-blow-horn replacing the horn ring) and three-point front seatbelts.  In a first, the Mark III became the first American-brand vehicle sold with radial tires as standard equipment.

For 1971, automatic climate control became standard and Sure-Track anti-lock braking (ABS) was introduced as an option.

Third generation (Mark IV; 1972–1976) 

For 1972, the Continental Mark III was replaced by the all-new Continental Mark IV.  In response to the success of the Mark III, the model line was again developed alongside the Ford Thunderbird, with the two coupes sharing a common roofline and inner body stampings (the Mark IV was styled with its own bodywork below the windows).  

The Mark IV adopted multiple design features from its predecessor, including hidden headlamps, spare-tire trunklid, and a radiator-style grille (initially extending into the front bumper).  To modernize the appearance of the model line, widely flared wheel openings were the same height for both axles (precluding skirted rear wheels).  To further distinguish the Mark IV from the Thunderbird, an oval opera window was introduced as a C-pillar design feature; offered as an option for 1972, the design became standard for 1973.

For 1973, the Mark IV received a facelift of its front fascia, adopting larger 5-mph front bumpers and a smaller front grille (placed above the bumper).  For 1974, the rear bumper was redesigned in a similar fashion, with the taillamps relocated from inside the bumper to above it.  Added in compliance with federal regulations, the updates added 8 inches of length and nearly 400 pounds of weight to the body, with the Mark IV outgrowing the Cadillac Eldorado in size.

Special editions 

In line with its status of a personal luxury car, the Mark IV offered a greater degree of customization over its Mark III predecessor.  The Luxury Group option (introduced in 1973) was a higher-trim version of the Mark IV, offering color-coordinated exterior, vinyl roof, and interior; the color offerings were revised yearly.

In what would become a long-running tradition for the Mark Series (and later Lincoln), the Designer Edition series was introduced in 1976.  Similar to the Luxury Group, the Designer Edition series was a collaboration between Ford and fashion designers to create specially-coordinated exterior and interior combinations.  Named after  Cartier, Bill Blass, Givenchy, and Emilio Pucci, each version of the Designer Edition received the name of the selected designer on the opera window (alongside badging near the glovebox).

Fourth generation (Mark V; 1977–1979) 

For 1977, the Continental Mark IV underwent a substantial redesign, becoming the Mark V.  Growing even further in size (at 230 inches long, only 3 inches shorter than the Continental), the Mark V retained the chassis underpinnings of its Mark IV predecessor; careful engineering reduced its curb weight by over 400 pounds.  As the Thunderbird was shifted to the Ford Torino intermediate chassis for 1977, the Mark V was the first generation of the Mark series since the Mark II produced with no divisional counterpart.  

In line with its Mark IV chassis underpinnings, the Mark V returned many traditional design elements from its predecessor, but adopted sharper-edged fender and window lines.  While sharing much of its front fascia styling with the Lincoln Continental, the Mark IV introduced vertical taillamps and front fender vents.  While technically a delete option, a vinyl top was specified on nearly all vehicles; for 1979, it became standard.    

To improve the fuel economy of the model line, Ford introduced a 400 cubic-inch V8 as the standard engine; the 460 V8 remained an option (outside of California).  For 1979, the 460 was discontinued entirely, leaving the 400 as the sole engine offering.  As an industry first, Ford introduced an optional LED "miles-to-empty" gauge for 1978; a precursor to later trip computers, the gauge calculated estimated fuel range (based on the fuel tank level).

Special editions 

Though the Mark V is the shortest-produced generation, 1977, 1978, and 1979 are also the highest-selling model years for the entire Mark series.  From the Mark IV, the Luxury Group and all four Designer Editions made their return, changing their color combinations yearly.  

To commemorate the 75th anniversary of Ford Motor Company, a Diamond Jubilee Edition of the Mark V was offered for 1978.  A nearly $8000 option, the Diamond Jubilee Edition option package included a nearly monochromatic exterior in two option-exclusive color choices (Diamond Blue or Jubilee Gold) along with a crystal hood ornament.  The interior received a center console and front bucket seats.  Including nearly every available feature, the only stand-alone options were a 460 V8, moonroof, or a CB radio.  

To commemorate the end of Continental Mark V production, a Collectors Edition was offered for 1979.  Again offered for $8000, the option package offered a monochromatic exterior appearance with option-exclusive colors (further distinguished by the deletion of the opera windows).  Offering largely every feature as standard, a delete option replaced the 8-track stereo with a cassette player.

Fifth generation (Mark VI; 1980–1983) 

For 1980, Ford downsized the Mark series, with the Mark V replaced by the Continental Mark VI.  Originally beginning life intended for the mid-size segment, budgetary constraints forced the company to produce the Mark VI as a full-size vehicle, sharing its body and full-size Panther chassis with Ford and Lincoln-Mercury.  14 inches shorter and 800 pounds lighter than the Mark V, the Mark VI was shorter than both the Mark II and the original Lincoln Continental.  

In place of the previous two-door hardtop coupe, the Mark VI was offered in two-door and four-door sedan bodystyles, adopting fully-framed door glass.  While the four-door shared much of its body with the Lincoln Continental (Lincoln Town Car after 1980), the Mark VI two-door (which used the shorter wheelbase of the Ford LTD/Mercury Marquis) was styled with a roofline similar to its Mark V predecessor.  To distinguish the Mark VI from its Lincoln Continental/Town Car counterparts, the Mark VI was styled with oval opera windows (deleted from the Town Car), hidden headlamps, front fender louvers, and forward-slanted vertical taillamps; the spare-tire decklid also made its return.    

The 1980 Mark VI introduced several firsts for Ford Motor Company, as the previous 7.5L and 6.6L V8s were replaced by a 4.9L fuel-injected V8 (with electronic engine controls, another industry first) and an 4-speed overdrive automatic transmission.  The new powertrain combination increased fuel economy of the model line by nearly 40% and was offered for all Ford and Lincoln-Mercury Panther-chassis vehicles for 1981.  As a replacement for the LED "miles-to-empty" gauge, the Mark VI offered a digital trip computer and a fully digital instrument panel (VFD) along with pushbutton keyless entry; the latter remains an option today in Ford automobiles.

Trim 

For 1980, the Signature Series was introduced as the highest-level trim for the Mark VI.  Similar in content to the previous Collector's Edition, the Signature Series combined nearly every feature in a single option package.  Initially offered in option-specific exterior and interior colors, the Signature Series was offered in any color from 1982 onward.  For 1981, a less-exclusive Town Car Signature Series was offered, with versions of the trim line offered through its entire production.  

As with the Mark IV and Mark V, the Mark VI continued to offer yearly-updated Designer Editions (Cartier, Bill Blass, Pucci, Givenchy).  During the production of the Mark VI, Designer Editions were expanded from the Mark series to the Lincoln line, with the Cartier Edition moving to the Town Car for 1982; for 1983, the Givenchy Edition was moved to the Continental.

Sixth generation (Mark VII; 1984–1992) 

For 1984, the Mark VII was introduced as the sixth generation of the Mark series.  In a nearly complete break from Mark series tradition, the Mark VII was developed with far better road manners than its Mark VI predecessor, prioritizing the driving experience as part of a contemporary personal luxury car.  Again matching its Cadillac Eldorado rival in size, the Mark VII adopted the mid-size Ford Fox platform.  A two-door counterpart of the 1982–1987 Lincoln Continental, the Mark VII shared its chassis underpinnings with the Ford Thunderbird and Mercury Cougar XR7.    

In addition to its role of Ford Motor Company flagship vehicle, the Mark VII also served as the technology flagship for the company, introducing multiple firsts for the company (and the industry as a whole).  The first vehicle sold in North America with electronic 4-channel antilock brakes, the Mark VII also was equipped with 4-wheel disc brakes and 4-wheel air suspension.  The 8-track player was retired, with an in-car telephone introduced as an option (for $2,995).  The fully digital instrument panel returned, along with a trip computer and on-board driver message center; all accessories were power-operated. 

Along with a smaller exterior footprint, the Mark VII was far more aerodynamic than its predecessors.  In contrast to previous generations, the bumpers were designed into the body, rather than attached onto it, with all glass made nearly flush (opera windows were retired).  Following successful government campaigns by Ford to legalize the feature, the Mark VII was the first American automobile to offer replaceable-bulb "composite" headlamps (allowing headlamps to be faired into bodywork).  To reduce drag, the spare-tire design feature was faired more closely into the decklid, with the grille slanted rearward.      

While sharing its wheelbase with the 1980-1982 Ford Thunderbird, the Mark VII shared its powertrain with the Ford Mustang; a 4.9L V8 was standard.  For 1984 and 1985, a rare option was a BMW-sourced 2.4L inline-6 turbodiesel (shared with the Lincoln Continental). 

The longest-produced Mark series generation, the Mark VII underwent few fundamental changes through its production.  For 1986, the Continental Mark VII was renamed the Lincoln Mark VII, retiring the Continental brand entirely and bringing the Mark series within the Lincoln line on an official basis.  For 1989, the Mark VII received the 4.9L "HO" engine of the Mustang GT.   For 1990, to accommodate a driver-side airbag, the Mark VII received a redesigned dashboard.

Trim 

For its launch, the Mark VII was marketed in an unnamed standard trim, Designer Editions, and the LSC.  All-new to the Designer Series, the Gianni Versace Edition was offered for 1984 and 1985; the Bill Blass Edition was offered through the entire production of the Mark VII, becoming the standard trim from 1988 to 1992. 

Introduced for 1984, the LSC (Luxury Sports Coupe) added far better road manners to the Mark VII than ever seen on any of its predecessors.  Sharing its engine with the Ford Mustang GT, the LSC received firmer suspension tuning, sportier seats, and model-specific exterior and interior trim (deleting wood trim altogether).  For 1986, the LSC received full analog instrumentation (replacing the digital dashboard); for 1990, 16-inch wheels were added, with an optional monochromatic exterior (deleting almost all chrome trim).

Seventh generation (Mark VIII; 1993–1998) 

For 1993, the Lincoln Mark VIII was released as the first generation of the Mark series entirely under the Lincoln brand.  Serving as a successor to the Mark VII LSC, the Mark VIII was a luxury-oriented grand touring coupe.  While maintaining its rivalry against the Cadillac Eldorado, the Mark VIII was also developed to compete against coupes from European and Japanese automakers.  Initially competing against the Acura Legend and Lexus SC, the Mark VIII also saw competition from the Acura CL, Mercedes-Benz CLK, and Volvo C70.

Slightly larger than its predecessor, the Mark VIII retired the Fox platform in favor of the all-new FN10 platform (a Lincoln-exclusive variant of the MN12 platform).  Alongside the Thunderbird and Cougar, the Mark VIII was the sole four-seat American car with both rear-wheel drive and independent rear suspension (at the time).  In another first, the Mark VIII was the first Ford Motor Company vehicle fitted with a dual overhead-cam V8 engine.

Far more futuristic than its predecessor, the Mark VIII exterior is nearly devoid of chrome trim, limited almost entirely to the grille, window trim, and headlamp/taillamp trim (in line with the original Mark II).  Though it would make its return, the spare-tire decklid design (in the interest of design and aerodynamics) was reduced to a vestigial feature.  In a design that would be adopted by multiple Ford vehicles, the interior of the Mark VIII was highly driver-oriented.

For 1995, the LSC received HID headlights, the first American car to do so.

For 1997, the exterior underwent a minor revision, receiving a larger grille and redesigned exterior lights.  HID headlights were made standard, with neon bulbs added to the brake lamps (a first in American cars); LED turn signal repeaters were mounted in the sideview mirrors.  To reduce drag, the spare-tire trunklid feature was reduced further in size.

Trim

From 1993 to 1994, the Mark VIII was offered in a single trim level, with the Designer Edition series retired from the model line.  

From 1995 to 1998, the sport/touring-oriented LSC (Luxury Sports Coupe) trim made its return.  Similar to its Mark VII predecessor, the Mark VIII LSC offered  model badging, body-color trim and its own suspension tuning, along with a distinct rear axle ratio, and true dual exhaust (raising engine output by 10hp) 

For 1996, Lincoln offered a Diamond Anniversary Edition for the Mark VIII (commemorating its 75th year of production).  Along with specific badging, the option included a voice-activated phone, leather seats, and upgraded audio system.

Continental branding
The use of the Continental nameplate by Ford Motor Company has been a source of confusion since the 1950s (similar to the branding confusion between Imperial and Chrysler Imperial).  The nameplate first saw use by Lincoln from 1939 to 1948 (skipping World War II).  After the vehicle was retired, the nameplate went dormant until Ford created the Continental Division in 1955.  Intended as the flagship marque of Ford Motor Company, Continental was slotted above Lincoln, with the Mark II personal luxury coupe serving as its inaugural product line.  Given the full nomenclature, Continental Mark II denoted Continental as the make and Mark II as the model and version. 

While the Mark II was produced for 1957, the Continental Division was discontinued in July 1956 and the Continental brand was integrated into the Mercury-Edsel-Lincoln Division (MEL) division, again slotted above Lincoln.  Though sold and serviced in the same dealerships as Lincolns, Continentals were not badged as Lincolns, nor did any identification plates, VINs, and factory paperwork bear the Lincoln name.  Following the discontinuation of Edsel, the division again became Lincoln-Mercury.   

Following the retirement of the Mark II, the Continental brand returned to use for 1958 for a successor Continental Mark III.  Though derived closely from the Lincoln line, the Mark III again did not use any Lincoln branding on an official basis, nor did the 1959 Continental Mark IV.  As the series came more popular, the Lincoln name became colloquially attached (though incorrectly); for the 1960 Continental Mark V, Lincoln-Mercury referred to the model line as a Lincoln Continental in brochures and advertising (also in preparation for the nameplate to become the sole Lincoln model series for 1961).  Though the Lincoln name never appeared on the 1958–1960 Mark III–Mark V, Continental was often not properly registered or recognized as the make of Mark Series vehicles by dealerships or state motor vehicle departments.  

When Ford introduced the Mark III as the direct successor of the Continental Mark II for 1969, the model line also returned the Continental brand name to use.  Resuming its previous position as a Ford Motor Company flagship, the model line was marketed above Lincoln within the Lincoln-Mercury dealership network.  Sold in the same showroom as the Lincoln Continental, the Mark III and its successors shared advertising materials with the Lincoln model line.   

Prior to 1981 production, there was no distinct indicator in vehicle identification numbers (VINs) for vehicle make or manufacturer.  VINs only had indicators for the model year, assembly plant, body series (which represented only the vehicle model name and body style type), engine size and sequential production number.  From 1981 onward, all vehicle manufacturers were required by the National Highway Traffic Safety Administration (NHTSA) to use a 17-character VIN-code with more detailed information.  The first three digits is the World Manufacturer Identifier which indicates the country of origin and make of a vehicle.  The 1981–1983 Continental Mark VI, 1984–1985 Mark VII, and the 1982–1985 Lincoln Continental 4-door sedan (which was always badged as a Lincoln) have the separate VIN code 1MR which designates Continental as the make instead of 1LN as Lincoln (used by the Lincoln Town Car) 

For the 1986 model year, Ford Motor Company clarified confusion over the branding of the Continental and Mark series, renaming the Continental Mark VII as the Lincoln Mark VII.  Along with the change in marketing, the revision was also made to the VIN of the model line, with both the Mark VII and Continental sedan assigned the 1LN manufacturer code of Lincoln.  For the first time, the Lincoln nameplate appeared on a Mark series vehicle.  

In contrast to its predecessors, the 1993–1998 Lincoln Mark VIII never used Continental as a marque or model name.

Continental star 
Following the closure of the Continental Division and its integration into Lincoln-Mercury, Lincoln adopted the four-point "Continental Star" emblem of the Mark II.   Since 1958, the emblem (in various forms) has remained in use on both the Mark series and Lincoln vehicles.

Further use of name

MK9, MKR, and Mark X concept cars

In the early 2000s, Lincoln produced two personal-luxury concept cars using the Mark Series name.  The two-door MK9 (pronounced "Mark Nine") debuted at the 2001 New York International Auto Show.  Intended to explore the Mark Series past the discontinued Mark VIII, the MK9 was a two-door sedan with rear-wheel drive and a DOHC V8 engine  The styling of the MK9 influenced several later concepts, including the 2002 Continental concept and the 2003 Navicross.

The use of letters to identify different models began during Ford's acquisition of British luxury marques Jaguar, Aston Martin, and to a lesser extent Swedish marque Volvo in the Premier Automotive Group. Letters were used to identify the Jaguar XJ, the Jaguar XK8, the Aston Martin DB7, and the Volvo S60 and Volvo XC70.

In 2004, the last car to use the Mark Series name debuted at the Detroit Auto Show.  The Mark X ("Mark Ten") was a two-seat convertible; a first for the Mark Series.  Mechanically based on the 2002–2005 Ford Thunderbird, the Mark X added a power-folding retractable hardtop.  Although its Thunderbird origins were apparent above the window line, much of the Mark X was restyled for a contemporary and modern appearance (rather than the retro styling seen on its Ford stablemate).

In a break from Mark Series tradition, the Continental spare-tire hump on the decklid was left out of the design of the two concept cars.

Another concept car was introduced in 2007, called the Lincoln MKR. It was a premium four door fastback sedan based on the Ford Mustang platform which influenced the design themes of production Lincolns for a number of years.

Mark LT (2005–2008)

After the discontinuation of the Blackwood after a single year of production in 2002, Lincoln stayed out of the pickup truck market for three years.  In 2005, the division tried again with the Lincoln Mark LT.  As with the Blackwood, the Mark LT was based on the crew-cab version of the F-150; a major change from the Blackwood was the availability of all-wheel drive and the use of a conventional pickup box.  After the 2008 model year, the Mark LT was rebadged as the Platinum trim level of the Ford F-150 in the United States and Canada, remaining for sale only in Mexico until 2014.

Lincoln MK naming scheme

During the 1990s, American luxury brands such as Lincoln lost market share to German and Japanese brands.  As Lincoln and Cadillac began modernizing their lineups during the early 2000s, they both began to adopt alphanumeric naming schemes used by their competitors.  At Lincoln, this started with the 2000 LS, which created some objections by Toyota, the owners of Lexus.  As the LS and the Continental were both discontinued in the mid-2000s, the division introduced a new alphanumeric naming scheme that would partly revive the Mark Series.  From 2007 to 2015, all newly introduced Lincolns would wear the "MK" designation; the lone exceptions were the Town Car and the Navigator.  With the "MK" designation, it was originally intended to be pronounced "Mark" followed by the vehicle model letter as in "Mark S", "Mark T", "Mark X" or "Mark Z". Once the new naming convention reached the initial public, "MK" was commonly mispronounced "em kay" and it was decided by Lincoln marketing to officially pronounce it that way instead. After the 2011 model year, the Navigator became the sole non-MK Lincoln as the Town Car sedan was discontinued.  However, for 2017 Lincoln discontinued the MKS and brought back the Continental name for its all-new flagship sedan. Since then Lincoln has brought back conventional names for successive model replacements.

See also 
Cadillac Eldorado
Imperial
Mercedes-Benz S-Class Coupé

Notes

References

Bibliography
 
 
 

 
Full-size vehicles
Mark
Coupés
Rear-wheel-drive vehicles
1950s cars
1960s cars
1970s cars
1980s cars
1990s cars
Luxury vehicles
Personal luxury cars